The 1987 WAFL season was the 103rd season of the West Australian Football League in its various incarnations. This season saw a Western Australia-based team, was one of two interstate teams (along with the Gold Coast-based Brisbane Bears) to make their debut in the Victorian Football League (VFL), which had profound effects on the WAFL competition. The Eagles took away thirty-five of the competition's best players, severely reducing attendances and club revenue, the latter of which was further affected by the payment of the Eagles’ licence fee to the VFL. The WAFL budgeted for a 30 percent decline in attendances, but the observed decline was over fifty percent, and they were also hit by Channel Seven telecasting the Round 17  versus  match, breaching agreements to not telecast non-Eagles VFL matches to Perth.

As small compensation, Claremont under captain-coach Gerard Neesham developed an innovation possession-oriented “chip and draw” style of football that allowed the Tigers to achieve the best record of any WA(N)FL team since East Fremantle's unbeaten season of 1946. Claremont lost only its second game, finishing the season with twenty-one consecutive undefeated matches – Peter Melesso getting the Tigers out of its only two possible defeats by after-the siren kicks. An outstanding defence led by future Eagle champion Guy McKenna permitted the fewest points against any WA(N)FL team since the wet 1973 season, whilst utility Derek Kickett polled 46 Sandover Medal votes but was ineligible due to suspension and the return of Warren Ralph made the attack the best in the league. Over the three grades, Claremont amassed a record total of 53 wins and three draws from 63 matches.

South Fremantle, who appeared revitalised early in the season, suffered a crippling injury and suspension toll plus the walkout of returning star “Jacko” Jackson and the elevation to West Coast of early-season stars Hart and Worsfold. This left the Bulldogs with twenty-five senior players unavailable mid-season, and the club consequently suffered eighteen consecutive losses to take the wooden spoon for the first time since 1972 and the last to date. In the middle of the season South Fremantle were fielding twelve or more first-year players. Although coach Magro admitted many were not up to league standard in 1987, some of these like Peter Matera were to be decisive in returning the red and whites to prominence the following season. Perth, league finalists in 1986 for the first time since 1978, fell from twelve wins to six as the Demons were severely affected by the loss of key players Wiley and Yorgey to the VFL, and dynamic forward Wayne Ryder with a series of knee injuries that never allowed him two games in succession.

Major innovations were the pre-season ‘Kresta Cup’ night competition, in which the Tigers showed traces of their devastating form during the winter, the return of Perth to the WACA Ground after twenty-eight seasons playing at Lathlain Park, and the first night matches for premiership points in WA(N)FL history. Improved drainage and a drier climate in Perth completely eliminated problems experienced at the WACA in the 1940s and 1950s; nonetheless the move was not regarded as a success and the Demons returned to Lathlain in 1989.

Clubs

Home-and-away season

Round 1

Round 2

Round 3 (Easter weekend)

Round 4 (Anzac Day)

Round 5

Round 6

Round 7

Round 8

Round 9

Round 10

Round 11

Interstate match

Round 12

Round 13

Round 14

Round 15

Round 16

State-of-Origin Match

Round 17

Round 18

Round 19

Round 20

Round 21

Ladder

Finals

First semi-final

Second semi-final

Preliminary final

Grand Final

Notes
Since the WAFA expanded to six clubs in 1901, the only other clubs to have bettered Claremont's 1987 record are East Perth with a perfect season of 21 wins in the 1944 under-age competition, and Subiaco with 21 wins and a one-point loss in 2008.Moylan acted as coach for the Round 19 match against East Fremantle as Brown was so ill at midday he had to leave the coach's box.All Eagles matches in Victoria from the club's formation were broadcast live to Perth, and despite the time difference with eastern Australia this broadcast still overlapped with playing times for WAFL matches.No AFL player was ever charged with biting any part of an opponent until Chris Lewis was charged with biting Todd Viney in the sixteenth round of 1991.

References

External links
Official WAFL website
West Australian Football League Season 1987

West Australian Football League seasons
WAFL